During the 2003–04 season, Bradford City participated in the Football League First Division.

Season summary
Bradford City were relegated from the First Division after 3 seasons in the division. Manager Bryan Robson left at the end of the season, and was replaced by his assistant Colin Todd.

Defender Paul Heckingbottom was the club's player of the year.

League table

Kit
Bradford's kits were manufactured by Italian company Diadora and sponsored by Bradford-based car dealership JCT600.

First-team squad
Squad at end of season

Left club during season

Transfers

In
 Paul Heckingbottom - Norwich City, July, free
 Michael Branch - Wolves, free

References

2003-04
Bradford City